Sergio Garavini (18 May 1926 – 7 September 2001) was an Italian politician, writer and trade unionist.

Biography 
Garavini was born in Turin.

At a very young age, he entered the Italian Communist Party (PCI) and the trade union Italian General Confederation of Labour (CGIL), which he contributed to reform after the defeat in the FIAT internal elections of 1955. He was subsequently regional secretary of CGIL, secretary of FIOM (CGIL's metallurgic workers confederation) and, finally, national secretary of CGIL.

In the trade union conflict between Fausto Bertinotti (who always favoured strikes) and Sergio Cofferati (more incline to mediation), Garavini usually sided for the first policy, but also proposed intermediate solutions such as the intermittent strike or the permanent consultation.

As a member of PCI, he supported Rossana Rossanda when she formed the party-newspaper il manifesto and was later expelled from the party, but Garavini never abandoned it. He was a staunch supporter of the automatic recovery of salaries against inflation, which was introduced thanks to CGIL in 1975. He was elected in the Italian Chamber of Deputies in June 1987, being confirmed in the elections of five years later.

When PCI secretary Achille Occhetto proposed to renounce to the party's communist nature and to form the Democratic Party of the Left, Garavini founded, on 15 December 1991, the Communist Refoundation Party, of which he was national secretary until 1993, when he resigned, being replaced by Fausto Bertinotti.

In 1995 Garavini, then a deputy for the Communist Refoundation, voted confidence to the center cabinet led by Lamberto Dini, in contrast with his party's guidelines. Subsequently, he left to form, together with the party's right wing such as Lucio Magri and Famiano Crucianelli, the Movement of Unitarian Communists, which in 1998 merged with the Democrats of the Left.

Garavini wrote numerous essays on Italian politics and trade unions, such as Ripensare l'illusione. Una prospettiva dalla fine del secolo of 1993. He died in Rome in September 2001.

See also 
 Shadow Cabinet of Italy (1989)

References 

1926 births
2001 deaths
Politicians from Turin
Italian Communist Party politicians
20th-century Italian politicians
Communist Refoundation Party politicians
Italian trade unionists